The '''Faith Temple also Templul Credința, Sinagoga Credinta, Templul Hevrah Amuna''' is a Jewish synagogue, built in 1926, that is located on 48 Toneanu Vasile Street in Bucharest, Romania.

See also
 List of synagogues in Romania
 List of synagogues in Bucharest

References 

Synagogues in Bucharest
Synagogues completed in 1926
1926 establishments in Romania